Tagore Arts College (French: Collège des arts de Tagore), is one of the oldest general degree colleges located in Lawspet, Puducherry. It was established in 1961 by the Government of Pondicherry (now Puducherry). The college is affiliated with Pondicherry University. This college offers only Bachelor degree with different courses in arts, commerce and science.

Departments

Science
Physics
Chemistry
Mathematics
Plant Science
Zoology
Psychology
Computer Science

Arts and Commerce
Tamil
English
French
History
Sociology
Philosophy
Tourism
Economics
Commerce

Accreditation
The college is  recognized by the University Grants Commission (UGC).

References

External links
 Tagore Arts College, Puducherry - official website

Universities and colleges in Puducherry
Educational institutions established in 1961
1961 establishments in Pondicherry
Colleges affiliated to Pondicherry University
Academic institutions formerly affiliated with the University of Madras